John Bradley Werenka (born February 12, 1969) is a Canadian former professional ice hockey defenceman. He was drafted by the Edmonton Oilers in the second round of the 1987 NHL Entry Draft, 47th overall. Werenka played college hockey for the Northern Michigan University Wildcats, with whom he won the 1991 NCAA hockey title. In addition to minor pro experience, Werenka went on to play for the Oilers, Quebec Nordiques, Chicago Blackhawks, Pittsburgh Penguins, and Calgary Flames. His career was ended December 29, 2000 due to a concussion suffered in a game.  He represented Canada at the 1994 Winter Olympics, winning a silver medal and being named to the All-Star Team.

Awards and honors

Career statistics

Regular season and playoffs

International

References

External links

1969 births
Living people
Calgary Flames players
Canadian ice hockey defencemen
Cape Breton Oilers players
Chicago Blackhawks players
Cornwall Aces players
Edmonton Oilers draft picks
Edmonton Oilers players
Ice hockey people from Alberta
Ice hockey players at the 1994 Winter Olympics
Indianapolis Ice players
Medalists at the 1994 Winter Olympics
Milwaukee Admirals (IHL) players
Northern Michigan Wildcats men's ice hockey players
Olympic ice hockey players of Canada
Olympic medalists in ice hockey
Olympic silver medalists for Canada
People from Two Hills, Alberta
Pittsburgh Penguins players
Quebec Nordiques players
NCAA men's ice hockey national champions
AHCA Division I men's ice hockey All-Americans